Jordan Cox (born January 7, 1992) is an American tennis player.

Cox has a career high ATP singles ranking of 449 achieved on March 21, 2011. He also has a career high ATP doubles ranking of 605 achieved on July 30, 2012.

Cox made his ATP main draw debut at the 2017 BB&T Atlanta Open in the doubles draw partnering Emil Reinberg.

ATP Challenger and ITF Futures finals

Singles: 3 (1–2)

Doubles: 5 (3–2)

Junior Grand Slam finals

Singles: 1 (1 runner-up)

External links

1992 births
Living people
American male tennis players
Sportspeople from Bradenton, Florida
Tennis players from Miami
Georgia Gwinnett Grizzlies athletes
College men's tennis players in the United States